Adventure is a lost 1925 American silent drama film produced by Famous Players-Lasky, distributed by Paramount Pictures, directed by Victor Fleming, and featuring Wallace Beery in a major supporting role. The picture is based on Jack London's 1911 novel Adventure.

Plot
A Solomon Islands plantation owner, David Sheldon (Tom Moore) becomes ill from blackwater fever following the death of many of his fieldhands from the disease. Joan Lackland (Pauline Starke), a female soldier of fortune, arrives by schooner in the islands. Enlisting the aid of her Kanaka crew, she defends Sheldon from an attack by the natives, led by Googomy (Noble Johnson). Joan becomes David's business partner after nursing him back to health and helps protect his mortgaged property from two greedy moneylenders. In attempting to gain revenge, the moneylenders incite the natives to revolt.

Cast
 Tom Moore as David Sheldon
 Pauline Starke as Joan Lackland
 Wallace Beery as Morgan
 Raymond Hatton as Raff
 Walter McGrail as Tudor
 Duke Kahanamoku as Noah Noa
 James Spencer as Adam
 Noble Johnson as Googomy

References

External links

 
 
 
 

Films based on American novels
Films directed by Victor Fleming
American black-and-white films
1925 films
American silent feature films
Lost American films
1920s adventure drama films
American adventure drama films
Films set in the Solomon Islands
1925 lost films
Lost adventure drama films
1925 drama films
1920s American films
Silent American drama films
Silent adventure drama films
1920s English-language films
English-language drama films